WFLV (90.7 FM) is a contemporary Christian formatted radio station in West Palm Beach, Florida, owned by the Educational Media Foundation and branded as K-Love. WFLV airs Contemporary worship music on its HD2 subchannel.

History
The station signed on in 1969 as WHRS-FM, an outreach of the School District of Palm Beach County to the large number of migrant families in the Palm Beaches. (Its calls represented one of its public schools, Hagen Road Elementary School.) It joined the then-new National Public Radio network in 1972. Originally airing a mix of classical music and fine arts programming with Spanish and bilingual programming in the mornings, it gradually evolved into a typical NPR classical music and fine arts station.  In 1981, WHRS was sold to South Florida Public Telecommunications, the community group that owned the license for the area's new PBS station, WWPF-TV, which changed its calls to WHRS-TV before signing on in 1982.  In 1985, the two stations changed their call letters to WXEL-FM-TV.  Barry University bought the stations in 1997.

In April 2005, Barry announced a pending purchase of both WXEL and WXEL-TV to a group consisting of Educational Broadcasting Corporation (owners of New York City's WNET and WLIW) and the Community Broadcast Foundation of Palm Beach and the Treasure Coast, a local volunteer organization. Barry University decided to terminate the sale in May 2008.

Another deal to sell WXEL radio, this time to American Public Media, doing business as Classical South Florida, was reached on April 20, 2010 after receiving approval from the station's trustees. The sale closed on May 25, 2011 and, as WXEL-TV was not included in the deal, the call letters of the radio station were changed to WPBI. APM operated the station as a full-time satellite of its Miami station, WKCP.

With the sale, all NPR news programming moved to WPBI's HD Radio subchannel.  A low-powered translator, W270AD in West Palm Beach, relays the subchannel's schedule; it had previously been used to simulcast WKCP.  Most of the market gets at least grade B coverage from WLRN-FM in Miami or WQCS Fort Pierce.

Translators

References

External links

West Palm Beach, Florida
K-Love radio stations
Educational Media Foundation radio stations
1969 establishments in Florida
Radio stations established in 1969
FLV